Oxyaenidae ("sharp hyenas") is a family of extinct carnivorous placental mammals. Traditionally classified in order Creodonta, this group is now classified in its own order Oxyaenodonta ("sharp tooth hyenas") within clade Pan-Carnivora in mirorder Ferae. The group contains four subfamilies comprising fourteen genera. Oxyaenids were the first to appear during the late Paleocene in North America, while smaller radiations of oxyaenids in Europe and Asia occurred during the Eocene.

Etymology

The name of family Oxyaenidae comes , name of hyena genus Hyaena and taxonomic suffix "-idae".

Description
They were superficially cat-like mammals that walked on flat feet, in contrast to modern cats, which walk and run on their toes. Anatomically, characteristic features include a short, broad skull, deep jaws, and teeth designed for crushing rather than shearing, as in the hyaenodonts or modern cats.

Oxyaenids were specialized carnivores that preyed on other terrestrial vertebrates, eggs and insects. They were capable of climbing trees, which is suggested by fossil evidence of their paws.

Classification and phylogeny

Taxonomy
 Order: †Oxyaenodonta (Van Valen, 1971)
 Family: †Oxyaenidae (Cope, 1877)
 Subfamily: †Machaeroidinae (Matthew, 1909)
 Genus: †Apataelurus (Scott, 1937)
 †Apataelurus kayi (Scott, 1937)
 †Apataelurus pishigouensis (Tong & Lei, 1986)
 Genus: †Diegoaelurus (Zack, Poust & Wagner, 2022)
 Diegoaelurus vanvalkenburghae (Zack, Poust & Wagner, 2022)
 Genus: †Isphanatherium (Lavrov & Averianov, 1998)
 Isphanatherium ferganensis (Lavrov & Averianov, 1998)
 Genus: †Machaeroides (Matthew, 1909)
 †Machaeroides eothen (Matthew, 1909)
 †Machaeroides simpsoni (Dawson, 1986)
 Incertae sedis:
 †Machaeroidinae sp. (CM 2386) (Zack, 2019)
 †Machaeroidinae sp. (FMNH PM 1506) (Tomiya, 2021)
 †Machaeroidinae sp. (USNM 173514) (Zack, 2019)
 Subfamily: †Oxyaeninae (Cope, 1877)
 Genus: †Argillotherium (Davies, 1884)
 †Argillotherium toliapicum (Davies, 1884)
 Genus: †Dipsalidictis (paraphyletic genus) (Matthew & Granger, 1915)
 †Dipsalidictis aequidens (Matthew & Granger, 1915)
 †Dipsalidictis krausei (Gunnell & Gingerich, 1991)
 †Dipsalidictis platypus (Matthew & Granger, 1915)
 †Dipsalidictis transiens (Matthew & Granger, 1915)
 Genus: †Malfelis (Stucky & Hardy, 2007)
 †Malfelis badwaterensis (Stucky & Hardy, 2007)
 Genus: †Oxyaena (Cope, 1874)
 †Oxyaena forcipata (Cope, 1874)
 †Oxyaena gulo (Matthew & Granger, 1915)
 †Oxyaena intermedia (Denison, 1938)
 †Oxyaena lupina (Cope, 1874)
 †Oxyaena pardalis (Matthew & Granger, 1915)
 †Oxyaena simpsoni (Van Valen, 1966)
 †Oxyaena woutersi (Lange-Badré & Godinot, 1982)
 Genus: †Patriofelis (Leidy, 1870)
 †Patriofelis ferox (Marsh, 1872)
 †Patriofelis ulta (Leidy, 1870)
 Genus: †Protopsalis (Cope, 1880)
 †Protopsalis tigrinus (Cope, 1880)
 Genus: †Sarkastodon (Granger, 1938)
 †Sarkastodon henanensis (Tong & Lei, 1986)
 †Sarkastodon mongoliensis (Granger, 1938)
 Subfamily: †Palaeonictinae (Denison, 1938)
 Genus: †Ambloctonus (Cope, 1875)
 †Ambloctonus major (Denison, 1938)
 †Ambloctonus priscus (Matthew & Granger, 1915)
 †Ambloctonus sinosus (Cope, 1875)
 Genus: †Dipsalodon (paraphyletic genus) (Jepsen, 1930)
 †Dipsalodon churchillorum (Rose, 1981)
 †Dipsalodon matthewi (Jepsen, 1930)
 †Dipsalodon sp. (UM 71172) (Rose, 1981)
 Genus: †Palaeonictis (de Blainville, 1842)
 †Palaeonictis gigantea (de Blainville, 1842)
 †Palaeonictis occidentalis (Osborn, 1892)
 †Palaeonictis peloria (Rose, 1981)
 †Palaeonictis wingi (Chester, 2010)
 Subfamily: †Tytthaeninae (Gunnell & Gingerich, 1991)
 Genus: †Tytthaena (Gingerich, 1980)
 †Tytthaena lichna (Rose, 1981)
 †Tytthaena parrisi (Gingerich, 1980)

Phylogeny
The phylogenetic relationships of family Oxyaenidae are shown in the following cladogram:

See also
 Mammal classification
 Ferae
 Creodonta

References

Further reading
 David Lambert and the Diagram Group. The Field Guide to Prehistoric Life. New York: Facts on File Publications, 1985. 

 
Prehistoric mammal families